Por Vida is the debut EP by American singer Kali Uchis. The project was released as a free download on February 4, 2015, via Kali Uchis' website and later released to digital streaming platforms. It features production by Tyler, the Creator, Kaytranada, Caleb Stone, BadBadNotGood, and XXXChange. The EP has been described as a "dreamy, autobiographical" offering. It was supported by four singles; "Know What I Want", "Lottery", "Loner" and "Ridin' Round".

Track listing

Notes
 The songs "Honey Baby" and "Pablo Escobar" (later renamed "angel") were originally made to be included in this EP but for unrevealed reasons they were left out of the final version.
 A music video for the song "Know What I Want" was shot and uploaded to Uchis' official Youtube Channel. For unclear reasons the video was archived and it can no longer be viewed from her channel.
 The artwork has been changed several times throughout the years.

References

2015 EPs
Albums produced by Tyler, the Creator
Albums produced by Kaytranada
Albums produced by BadBadNotGood
Self-released EPs
Kali Uchis albums